Baron Colchester, of Colchester in the County of Essex, was a title in the Peerage of the United Kingdom. It was created on 1 June 1817 for Charles Abbot, Speaker of the House of Commons between 1802 and 1817. He was succeeded by his son, the second Baron. He was a naval commander and Conservative politician. His son, the third Baron, was a barrister, President of the Oxford Union and a Charity Commissioner. He was childless and the title became extinct on his death in 1919.

Barons Colchester (1817)
Charles Abbot, 1st Baron Colchester (1757–1829)
Charles Abbot, 2nd Baron Colchester (1798–1867)
Reginald Charles Edward Abbot, 3rd Baron Colchester (1842–1919)

References

See also
 Viscount Colchester

Extinct baronies in the Peerage of the United Kingdom
Colchester
Noble titles created in 1817
Noble titles created for UK MPs